Diocirea acutifolia is a plant in the figwort family, Scrophulariaceae and is endemic to a small area near Norseman in Western Australia. The branches and leaves produce sticky resin which sometimes covers the whole plant making it appear bluish grey.

Description
Its branches are covered with raised light brown glands which produce a white resin.

The flowers are borne singly in leaf axils and lack a stalk. There are 5 egg-shaped, pointed green sepals and 5 petals. The tube is mostly glabrous except for a few hairs on the bottom lobe and inside the tube. There are 4 stamens which extend slightly beyond the petal tube.

Taxonomy and naming
The specific epithet (acutifolia) is derived from "Latin acutifolia, acute-leaved".

Distribution and habitat
Diocirea acutifolia occurs in a small area north of Norseman in the Coolgardie biogeographic region where it grows in woodland on gravelly loam.

Conservation
Diocirea acutifolia has been classified as "Priority Three" by the Government of Western Australia Department of Parks and Wildlife meaning that it is poorly known and known from only a few locations but is not under imminent threat.

References

acutifolia
Lamiales of Australia
Plants described in 2007
Endemic flora of Western Australia